Ideal School and College, also known as Motijheel Ideal School and College or Ideal High School (which was its name until 1990) is an educational institution in Bangladesh established in 1965. Although the school was set up to cater for the children of surrounding areas, students come from all parts of Dhaka. The institution has three campuses inside Dhaka in Motijheel, Banasree and Mugda.

History

'Ideal School and College' was inaugurated as a primary school on 15 March 1965 in Motijheel the heart of Dhaka city at the initiative of some education aspirants of Motijheel AGB Colony. The school was upgraded to a junior school in 1968 and after the independence in 1972, during the reign of the Father of the Nation, Bangabandhu Sheikh Mujibur Rahman, the school was upgraded to a full-fledged high school. Following the inauguration, until 1968 it was a junior school. The students from the school participated in Secondary School Certificate (SSC) examination (O-level equivalent) for the first time in 1973 and earned an extraordinary success for the very first time.

During the first 25 years, the school kept its growth as a high school only (10 years of formal education according to the Bangladeshi Standards). Following the demand and the requests from the guardians, a college (11th and 12th year of formal education according to the Bangladeshi Standards) for female students was added here in 1991.

The administration opened a new branch on the occasion of the 30th anniversary in 1996 in the Banasree residential project of Rampura with 702 students. Mohammad Faizur Rahman is the founder-headmaster of the institution. In 2003, the English version section of Motijheel campus opened. In 2012, the Banasree English version section was opened. Seeing the request of people, the government has granted 1 acre and 6 katha or 402 m2 for a new branch in Mugda. In 2011, the third branch of Ideal School and College opened. The prime minister of Bangladesh, Sheikh Hasina, inaugurated this branch by laying the foundation stone of the proposed academic building. At present, around twenty-six thousand students are studying in this reputed institution.

Historical events
1965: Initiative taken.
1965: Establishing year.
1968: Turned on to Junior school.
1972: Turned on to High school.
1973: Students first participated in SSC.
1991: College section opened.
1996: Started a new branch in Rampura Banasree project.
2003: Establishment of English Version in Motijheel campus.
2007: Completion of a four storied school campus for the Banasree branch.
2010: Construction started for a separate campus for English Version.
2011: 8 June, a new branch opened at Mugda, Dhaka.
2012: Authority decided to open English version on Banasree Branch.
2012: 9 June, a regular committee has been formed by the direct vote of the guardians and teachers.
2013: Construction of 2 Storied academic building at Banasree has been started.
2014: 26 October, construction of five stories of the English version building is completed.
2016: Start of construction of 8th to 10th storey of Academic Bhaban.
2017: Construction of 8th to 10th storey of Academic Bhaban is completed.

Campus

The institute has three campuses in Dhaka. Motijheel, Banasree and Mugda.

thumb

Motijheel
The Main Branch and College campus is beside Peerjongi's Majar and Motijheel AGB Colony. It was established on 15 March 1965 with the help of the people of AGB Colony. In 1980, President Ziaur Rahman granted 1.2 acres of this campus. There are six buildings.
 Main Building, 5 storied
 Science Building, 5 storied
 English Version Building, currently 7 storied (proposed 12 storied)
 College Building, 5 storied
 Academic Building, 10 storied
 Quarters, 4 storied

Banasree Branch
 School building, (4 storied)
It has a big playground and big corridor
 School building, English Version (10 storied)
 College building (Proposed 10 storied)

Mugda
The third campus is in Mugda. The government granted 1 acre and 6 katha or about 400 m2 land in 2010. It started classes with 1800 students on 20 March 2011. Classes were held in a one-storied tin-shed building. On 8 June 2011, Prime Minister Sheikh Hasina laid the foundation stone of the Academic Building. A 5 storied building has been built there. English version will be started here soon.

Academics
The school offers primary and secondary education in both Bengali Medium and English Version for boys and girl. Generally, boys and girls are split into separate shifts. Girls attend school in the morning shift while boys attend their classes starting at noon. Boys of class 1 to 3 attend classes in the morning shift. Morning shift starts from 6:45 am and ends at 11:30 am. Day shift starts at 12:00 pm and ends at 5:15 pm.

Controversy 
In 2020, hundreds of parents picketed the school and blocked a major road in Dhaka protesting the decision of making Islamic dress optional for students. Police arrested the head of the Guardian Unity Forum and 3 others allegedly for spreading rumours about the dress code for students of the institution.

See also
List of colleges in Bangladesh
List of universities in Bangladesh
Education in Bangladesh

References

External links
 Official website

Colleges in Dhaka District
High schools in Bangladesh
Educational institutions established in 1965
1965 establishments in East Pakistan